The 2nd General Assembly of the Island of St. John represented the colony of Prince Edward Island, then known as St. John's Island, between October 4, 1774, and 1779.

The Assembly sat at the pleasure of the Governor of St. John's Island, Walter Patterson. Robert Stewart was elected speaker.

Members

The members of the legislature after the general election of October 1, 1774, were:

References 
 Canada's Smallest Province, a history of Prince Edward Island, ed. FWP Bolger (1973)

External links 
 Prince Edward Island, garden province of Canada, WH Crosskill (1904)

02
1774 establishments in Prince Edward Island
1779 disestablishments in Prince Edward Island